Lukas Daniel Barnard (born 1949), known as Niël Barnard, is a former head of South Africa's National Intelligence Service and was notable for his behind-the-scenes role in preparing former president Nelson Mandela and former South African presidents P.W. Botha and F. W. de Klerk for Mandela's eventual and, as he saw it, inevitable, release from prison and rise to political power.

Early life

Niël Barnard was born in 1948 in Otjiwarongo, South West Africa (now Namibia). His father was headmaster and chief-inspector of education in SWA/Namibia. Barnard was in his teens at the time of the Rivonia Trial of 1963, in which Nelson Mandela and several other African National Congress leaders were convicted of treason and sentenced to life in prison. He did his compulsory military service in the commando system and reached the rank of captain and then was part of the Citizen Force in Bloemfontein. He met his wife, Engela Brand in 1968 and they married on 1 April 1972.

Education and University career

Barnard begun his education at the University of the Orange Free State in 1968 obtaining a Bachelor of Arts in Political Science and History. He followed this up by completing a Master of Arts in 1972 and a PhD in 1975. By 1973 Barnard was a Political Science lecturer at the same university. In 1977 he was a Senior lecturer and by 1978 a professor of Political Studies.

Intelligence career

He first came to the attention of P.W. Botha, after he had written a Ph.D. thesis at the University of the Orange Free State, although Barnard would claim in a 1992 newspaper interview that he was unsure as to why he was chosen, not having an intelligence background. In the wake of the Info scandal in which the Bureau of State Security (BOSS) had become mired, Botha appointed Barnard in November 1979 to form a new intelligence service. He started at the Department of National Security (DONS) as Chief Deputy Secretary on 3 December 1979. He would take over at DONS on 1 June 1980 after the retirement of the existing head Alec van Wyk. The Department of National Security was the new name of the Bureau of State Security (B.O.S.S.) and was renamed in September 1978 after the retirement of its head Hendrik van den Berg in June 1978. The National Intelligence Service came into operation in 1980.

Central to the new National Intelligence Service was a debate triggered by Niel Barnard, on the strategic objective of the new intelligence structure. Barnard believed that if the referent object is state security, then, in essence, it means that the intelligence structures have to secure the government from its own citizens. As an alternative, Barnard proposed a national security focus, which meant that security could best be achieved by focussing on threats to the nation, rather than the state. In essence, this implied constitutional reform to implement a universal franchise, thereby laying the foundation for the negotiated transition to democracy that took place in CODESA, an event envisaged and by NIS. For this reason, Barnard moved on to the Department of Constitutional Affairs as soon as CODESA had reached a point of no return.

The logic underpinning the new service was one of national security, which differed fundamentally from the state security paradigm that had underpinned BOSS.  Central to this new vision was the core belief that the only way to find lasting security was to develop a nation, and that meant renegotiating the constitution to include all South Africans irrespective of race. As the head of South Africa's National Intelligence Service (NIS), he recognized that his country would have to find a political settlement to eliminate apartheid and that Nelson Mandela would have to play a fundamental role in the process. He first met with Mandela in 1988 at the prison. He met many times with Mandela in order to inform him about the political situation outside the prison and advise him on how to negotiate with the South African president P. W. Botha. As secret talks commenced, Barnard arranged to have Nelson Mandela moved from Robben Island to the mainland, to facilitate more regular contact but also to prevent the media from becoming aware of the status of this contact.  To facilitate this process he allowed Operation Vula to continue because this deepened the contact between Nelson Mandela and the exiled leadership of the ANC. He arranged for Mandela to be given a suit of clothes befitting a future leader, and for future meetings to take place in a private residence near the prison.  While counseling both parties on how to come to some agreements on the terms for Mandela's eventual release, he arranged several more meetings.  When Botha's health forced him to resign, Barnard continued to facilitate discussions between Mandela and the new president, F. W. de Klerk.

Career after the NIS

Barnard was Director of the NIS from 1980 to 1992, when he was replaced by his long standing deputy Mike Louw. In 1994 Barnard took over a post in the Department of Constitutional Development and Provincial Affairs under Roelf Meyer in the Government of National Unity. It was this core logic that defined the ultimate role that Barnard was to play in creating the political climate behind the scenes for the Convention for a Democratic South Africa (CODESA) that ultimately drafted the constitution underpinning the transition to democracy in 1994.

References

Further reading

External links
 
 
 

South African spies
Apartheid government
Nelson Mandela
Living people
1949 births
University of the Free State alumni